Enis Ben Mohamed Hajri (born 6 March 1983) is a Tunisian professional footballer who plays as a defender or midfielder.

Career
Hajri played for Chernomorets Burgas between 2009 and 2011 after being transferred from German FSV Oggersheim in 2009 for free. He also holds a German passport.

He transferred to Chinese Super League side Henan Jianye on 13 February 2012. On 10 March 2012, he made his official debut as a starter in a 3–1 away loss against Liaoning Whowin.

On 19 June 2012, Hajri moved to 2. Bundesliga side 1. FC Kaiserslautern on a free transfer, signing a three-year contract.

On 22 July 2013, he joined CS Sfaxien on a one-year loan deal. Two months later he signed for FC 08 Homburg on loan.

He joined MSV Duisburg for the 2014–15 season. He left Duisburg after the 2018–19 season.

References

External links

1983 births
Living people
Tunisian footballers
Association football defenders
Association football midfielders
SpVgg Ludwigsburg players
SV Waldhof Mannheim players
FSV Oggersheim players
PFC Chernomorets Burgas players
Henan Songshan Longmen F.C. players
1. FC Kaiserslautern players
MSV Duisburg players
FC 08 Homburg players
First Professional Football League (Bulgaria) players
2. Bundesliga players
3. Liga players
Chinese Super League players
Expatriate footballers in Bulgaria
Expatriate footballers in China
Tunisian expatriate footballers
Expatriate footballers in Germany
Tunisian expatriate sportspeople in Bulgaria
Tunisian expatriate sportspeople in China
Tunisian expatriate sportspeople in Germany